Gulf University may refer to:

 Gulf University, Bahrain, university in Sanad, Bahrain
 Gulf University for Science and Technology, located in Kuwait
 Florida Gulf Coast University, located in the United States
 Persian Gulf University, located in Iran
 Arabian Gulf University, located in Manama, Bahrain
 Gulf Medical University, a university in Ajman, the United Arab Emirates